Victoria Bridge (originally known as the Hamilton Traffic Bridge and later also as The Bridge Street Bridge) is a steel arch bridge in Hamilton, New Zealand. The bridge has a Category I heritage protection.

It cost £25,500, equivalent to over $4m in 2017. It replaced the 1879 timber Union Bridge.

In 1929 stone steps were built beside the western end of the bridge to link to Ferry Bank.

Location and names
The bridge connects the suburbs of Hamilton Central and Hamilton East. The bridge was designed by James Fulton, and G M Fraser was the contractor. Work erecting the bridge, which was pre-fabricated in England by the Cleveland Bridge & Engineering Company, started in 1909.

The road that goes over the bridge has changed names several times. Up until 1930, the road was known as Richmond Street. A commemorative plaque refers to it as Hamilton Road, though. The name changed to Bridge Street. The latest name change happened in November 2015, when the road was officially renamed as Anzac Parade.

Repairs 
In 1919 the western king posts needed strengthening. A decade later, the foundations had spread  and the crown of the arch had dropped . Over the next 3 years the foundations spread up to a further ⅜in. and the crown settled up to another inch. Also  the deck reinforcing was very corroded. 6.5 ton and 10 mph limits were imposed. It was repaired and jacked up in 1937.

Heritage registration
On 30 August 1990, the bridge was registered as a Category I 'Historic Place' with the New Zealand Historic Places Trust (now known as Heritage New Zealand).

Present day

In 2010, the bridge celebrated its 100th year with a party in the park and unveiled a permanent interactive LED lighting system designed to illuminate the bridge for 10–15 years. This project was funded via a donation from the Perry Foundation. The party in the park featured a parade containing people in period costume and classic cars and rides and events for children. The event culminated in the display of a specially commissioned film projected onto a large screen next to the PS Rangiriri, Hamilton's historic paddle steamer in Hamilton East. At the end of the film, the light show was launched. The colour kinetics interactive lighting feature spans the entire structure and took seven days of rigging and many months of planning to install. The bridge is transformed into specific colours at certain times in order to welcome visiting sports teams and to celebrate national or local occasions.

Bronze figures depicting local historical figures have been fixed to the railings since 2010 to celebrate Hamilton's early years and connection to the river. These have faced some controversy as they appear to favour colonial histories to the detriment of the rich indigenous cultural connection to the area, and are a subject of some protest. From time to time "balancing" figures appear, highlighting these apparently missing elements.

References

 

Arch bridges
Steel bridges in New Zealand
Bridges over the Waikato River
Buildings and structures in Hamilton, New Zealand
1910s architecture in New Zealand
Bridges in Waikato
Bridges completed in 1910